Barisania lampra is a species of moth of the family Limacodidae. It is found on Sumatra and Borneo.

The wingspan is 27–33 mm. The forewings and hindwings are reddish-brown with a yellow outer margin.

References

External links 
 The Barcode of Life Data Systems (BOLD)

Limacodidae
Moths of Borneo
Moths of Sumatra
Moths described in 1937